KP Snacks is a British producer of branded and own-label maize-, potato-, and nut-based snacks, "Choc Dips" and nuts. The KP stands for “Kenyon Produce”. The company is based in Slough, England, UK.

History
The company was founded in Rotherham in 1853 as Kenyon & Son as a producer of confectionery, jam and pickles. By 1891 the company had become Kenyon & Son and Craven Limited.  The company switched to producing roasted and salted hazelnuts in 1948, expanding to peanuts later. These were originally produced for sale in cinemas. In 1952 the company introduced Hercules Nuts and in 1953 the No.1 KP Nuts peanut brand.

The company became part of United Biscuits (UB) in 1968. The KP Snacks subsidiary produces a range of packet snack brands including Hula Hoops, Skips, McCoy's, Frisps, Brannigan's, Royster's, Space Raiders, Nik Naks, Wheat Crunchies, Discos, and Phileas Fogg. The snacks part is based on Teesside and in Rotherham, near the UB distribution warehouse.

The Ashby-de-la-Zouch site won a Best Factory Award in 2004.

UB sold the company to the German company Intersnack in December 2012 for £500 million.

On 2nd February 2022 it was reported KP snacks supply chain was affected by a ransomware attack, which could last weeks.

Sourcing
As a group, they are the largest buyer of nuts in the world (as of 2019), sourcing from nations in Asia, Africa, South America and Central America.

They have various local aid and sustainability projects.

Brands

Brannigans (discontinued)
Butterkist
Choc Dips
Discos
Frisps
Hula Hoops
KP Jacks
KP Nuts
KP Skydivers (discontinued)
Meanies
McCoy's
Nik Naks
Penn State
Phileas Fogg (discontinued)
Popchips
Pom-Bear
Roysters
Skips
Space Raiders
Tyrrells
Velvet Crunch
Wheat Crunchies

Products

Butterkist (Popcorn)

Sharing Bags
 Toffee
 Sweet Cinema Style
 Sweet & Salted
 Salted

Microwave Popcorn
 Salted
 Sweet & Salted
 Sweet

Multipacks
 Toffee
 Sweet Cinema Style
 Sweet & Salted

Choc Dips
 Original (Milk Chocolate dip)
 White Chocolate

Discos
 Cheese & Onion
 Prawn Cocktail
 Salt & Vinegar

Frisps
 Cheese & Onion
 Ready Salted 
 Salt & Vinegar

Hula Hoops
 BBQ Beef
 Cheese & Onion
 Original (Salted) 
 Roast Chicken
 Salt & Vinegar
 Smokey Bacon
 Spicy 
 Tangy Cheese

Big Hoops 
 BBQ Beef
 Salted
 Salt & Vinegar
 Spicy Chilli

Puft (Light and Puffed Hula Hoops)
 Beef
 Salted 
 Salt & Vinegar
 Sweet Chilli

Flavarings
 Tangy Cheese
 Salt & Vinegar
 Spicy

KP Nuts
 Original Salted
 Dry Roasted
 Honey Roast
 Salt & Vinegar
 Spicy Chilli 
 Unsalted

McCoy's

Ridged

 Flame Grilled Steak
Salt & Malt Vinegar
Cheddar & Onion
Sizzling King Prawn
Hot Mexican Chilli
Thai Sweet Chicken
Salted
Bacon Sizzler
Chargrilled Chicken

Muchos
 Nacho Cheese
 Smoky Chilli Chicken 
 Cool Sour Cream & Onion

Nik Naks

 Scampi ‘n’ Lemon
 Nice ‘n’ Spicy 
 Rib ‘n’ Saucy

Penn State
 Original Sea Salted
 Sour Cream & Chive

Popchips
 Sea Salt
 Barbecue 
Mature Cheddar & Onion 
Sea Salt & Vinegar  
Sour Cream & Onion 
Salt & Pepper 
Thai Sweet Chilli

Ridges
 Crazy Hot
 Buffalo Ranch

Pom-Bear

Flavours 
 Original 
 Cheese & Onion
 Salt & Vinegar 
They are available in multipacks of 5, 6, 12, 18 and more.

Roysters
 T-Bone Steak

Skips
 Prawn Cocktail

Space Raiders

 Beef
 Pickled Onion
 Saucy BBQ
 Spicy

Tyrrells

 Lightly Salted
 Sea Salt & Cider Vinegar 
 Mature Cheddar & Chive 
 Sweet Chilli & Red Pepper
 Sea Salt & Black Pepper 
 Sunday Best Roast Chicken 
 Posh Prawn Cocktail
 Black Truffle & Sea Salt
 Smoked Paprika
 Naked (Unsalted)
 Sour Cream & Serenade Chilli

Furrows Crisps
 Sea Salt
 Sea Salt & Vinegar 
 Aberdeen Angus Beef
 Cheese & Pickled Onion

Veg Crisps

 Balsamic Vinegar & Sea Salt
 Parsnip, Beetroot & Carrot With Sea Salt

Popcorn
 Sweet & Salty
 Sea Salted 
 Sweet

Nut Medleys
 Sweet Chilli & Red Pepper 
 Sea Salt & Ground Black Pepper

Wheat Crunchies
 Cheddar & Onion
 Spicy Tomato
 Crispy Bacon

References

External links
 

Snack food manufacturers of the United Kingdom
Brand name snack foods
United Biscuits brands
Companies established in 1853
Brand name potato chips and crisps
Slough
Rotherham
Teesside